Petros Gaitanos ( born October 31, 1967)is a Greek singer. He was born and raised in the village of Kokkinogia located in Drama, Greece. 

Gaitanos has always enjoyed singing since childhood, and was singing professionally by the time he was 17. 

From 1986-1991 Gaitanos studied at the Athens Conservatoire and earned a degree in Byzantine music, as well as European music, while graduating magna cum laude.  Influenced by Byzantine music, he has produced a series of records with Byzantine works and hymns, and he is considered to be one of the most famous Byzantine musicians, especially in Greece. He has produced up to 44 musical albums, and has collaborated with artists such as Yiannis Fertis, Katia Dandoulaki, Yiannis Voglis, and Koralia Koranti. 

During his artistic career he served as artistic director of the Foundation "Karitteion Melathron". In Addition to his musical accomplishments, he has an extensive photo archive of his own photography that contains over one million photographs. 

In 2012 he expressed support for the far-right Greek party Golden Dawn. He later apologised for the comments, stating he had no relationship with Golden Dawn. He also enjoys traveling all over the world.

Discography

 1990 - Το δίλημμα (To Dilimma)
 1992 - Γυάλινος δρομέας (Gyalinos Dromeas)
 1993 - Σε πρώτο πρόσωπο (Se proto prosopo)
 1995 - Ώρα Ενάτη (Ora Enati)
 1996 - Πολιτεία Δ (Politeia D’)
 1997 - Τα Θεία Πάθη (Ta Theia Pathi)
 1998 - Αγέρας,έρωτας κι αρμύρα (Ageras, erotas ki armyra)
 1998 - Φως εκ φωτός (Fos ek fotos)
 1999 - Ψάλλω το Θεώ μου έως Υπάρχω (Psallo to Theo mou eos Yparcho)
 2000 - Σαν τα Κρύα τα νερά (San ta krya ta nera)
 2000 - Η πηγή της Ζωής (I pigi tis zois)
 2001 - Κρυφή Σελίδα (Kryfi selida)
 2003 - Πεντηκοστάριον (Pentikostarion)
 2006 - Τραγούδια του Πόντου (Tragoudia tou Pontou)

External links
Official page of Petros Gaitanos

References
Kοκκινόγεια Δράμας

1967 births
Living people
20th-century Greek male singers
Performers of Byzantine music
People from Drama, Greece
21st-century Greek male singers